Joseph-Marcellin Wilson (November 26, 1859 – September 10, 1940) was a Canadian merchant and senator.

Born in Île Bizard, Canada East, he was summoned to the Canadian Senate in 1911. A Liberal, he represented the senatorial division of Saurel, Quebec. He resigned in 1939. He died in 1940 and is buried in Notre-Dame-des-Neiges Cemetery.

References

External links

1859 births
1940 deaths
Canadian senators from Quebec
Liberal Party of Canada senators
People from L'Île-Bizard–Sainte-Geneviève
Burials at Notre Dame des Neiges Cemetery